Flying Start is the second  album by the American rhythm and blues and jazz-funk fusion group The Blackbyrds. Produced by Donald Byrd, the album includes the top ten hit single, "Walking in Rhythm".

Track listing
"I Need You"  (Donald Byrd, Kevin Toney)	
"The Baby"  (Donald Byrd)	
"Love Is Love"  (Keith Killgo) 	
"Blackbyrds' Theme"  (Kevin Toney, Allan Barnes, Joe Hall)
"Walking in Rhythm"  (Barney Perry)
"Future Children, Future Hopes"  (Kevin Toney)
"April Showers"  (Allan Barnes)	
"Spaced Out"  (Kevin Toney)

Personnel 
Donald Byrd - Trumpet, Flugelhorn, Vocals
Allan Barnes - Flute, Tenor Saxophone, Soprano Saxophone, Vocals
Kevin Toney - Acoustic and Electric Piano, Clavinet, ARP Synthesizer, Vocals
Barney Perry - Guitar, Vocals
Joe Hall - Bass, Vocals
Keith Killgo - Drums, Vocals
Perk Jacobs - Percussion, Vocals

Charts

Album

Single

References

External links
 The Blackbyrds-Flying Start at Discogs
 The Blackbyrds-Billboard Albums at AllMusic
 The Blackbyrds-Billboard Singles at AllMusic

1974 albums
Fantasy Records albums
The Blackbyrds albums